John Zakari (10 July 1973 – 17 November 2014), commonly known as John Zaki, was a Nigerian professional footballer who played as a striker.

Club career
In April 2000, Zaki joined South Korean side Jeonbuk Hyundai Motors.

Death
Zaki died on 27 November 2014.

Honours 
BCC Lions
 Nigerian Premier League: 1994
 Nigeria FA Cup: 1993, 1994

ASEC Mimosas
 Ivory Coast Ligue 1: 1995, 1997, 1998
 Coupe de Côte d'Ivoire: 1995, 1997

Al Hilal
 Saudi Premier League: 1995–96
 Saudi Federation Cup: 1995–96
 Arab Club Champions Cup: 1995
 Arab Super Cup: 1995

Individual
 Ivory Coast Ligue 1 top goalscorer: 1995

References

External links
 
 

1973 births
2014 deaths
Nigerian footballers
Association football forwards
BCC Lions F.C. players
ASEC Mimosas players
Al Hilal SFC players
Jeonbuk Hyundai Motors players
Nigeria Professional Football League players
Ligue 1 (Ivory Coast) players
K League 1 players
Nigeria international footballers
Nigerian expatriate footballers
Nigerian expatriate sportspeople in South Korea
Expatriate footballers in South Korea